Hysteria Hospital: Emergency Ward is a casual video game developed by Portuguese studio GameInvest with Camel Entertainment and published by O-Games on June 16, 2009 in North America. The game is a simulation/strategy that bears a striking resemblance to the popular Diner Dash franchise.

Gameplay
Hysteria Hospital tasks users with coordinating the management of a hospital. The goal of the game is to accumulate money over time by serving patients. Users can purchase new equipment such as X-Ray machines to meet the demands of their patients. Main gameplay elements involve diagnosing patients, and moving them to the applicable local facilities if available (or the ambulance to get sent elsewhere). Patients are moved by dragging them to different areas. A nurse is controllable by clicking on objects, and performs chores such as fetching prescriptions, making beds and cleaning waste.

Reception

The game was met with very mixed to negative reception upon release.  GameRankings and Metacritic gave it a score of 51% and 45 out of 100 for the DS version, and 50.30% and 53 out of 100 for the Wii version.

See also
Diner Dash

References

External links
Official game site

2009 video games
Nintendo DS games
Wii games
Windows games
Casual games
Business simulation games
Medical video games
Video games developed in Portugal
Oxygen Games games
Single-player video games